Meisam Mostafa-Jokar (born on January 25, 1985, in Malayer) is a male freestyle wrestler from Iran. He participated in Men's freestyle 74 kg at 2008 Summer Olympics. In the 1/8 of final he lost with Kiril Terziev and was eliminated from competition.

Meisam won two silver medals and one gold on Asian Championships. His older brother Masoud Mostafa-Jokar is an Olympic silver medalist.

External links
 
 
 

Living people
1985 births
Olympic wrestlers of Iran
Asian Games gold medalists for Iran
Wrestlers at the 2008 Summer Olympics
People from Malayer
Wrestlers at the 2014 Asian Games
Asian Games medalists in wrestling
Iranian male sport wrestlers
Medalists at the 2014 Asian Games
Asian Wrestling Championships medalists
20th-century Iranian people
21st-century Iranian people